Philotheca myoporoides subsp. euroensis is a subspecies of flowering plant in the family Rutaceae and is endemic to a small area in Victoria, Australia. It is a small shrub with curved, broadly elliptic leaves and white or pink flowers arranged singly or in groups of up to four in leaf axils.

Description
The stamens are free from each other and hairy. Flowering occurs from May to November and the fruit is prominently beaked.

Taxonomy and naming
This subspecies was first formally described in 1998 by Michael Bayly in the journal Muelleria.

Distribution and habitat
This subspecies is only known from a few small populations growing near granite boulders in the Strathbogie Ranges near Euroa in central-eastern Victoria.

References

myoporoides
Flora of Victoria (Australia)
Sapindales of Australia